Sherwood Cryer (September 2, 1927 – August 13, 2009) was a Pasadena, Texas-based entrepreneur. He was the originally owner and operator of a bar called Sherri's. He then formed a partnership with Mickey Gilley it became the western nightclub & Bar Gilley's, which was the central setting of the 1980 movie Urban Cowboy starring John Travolta and Debra Winger.

Biography
Charles Sherwood Cryer was from Diboll, Texas and worked as a welder for Shell Oil for a few years after his service in the Air Force during World War II. He settled in Pasadena, where his large tent-style honky tonk concept developed into what became Gilley's in 1971, located on a sprawling parcel of land at 4500 Spencer Highway, Pasadena, Texas 77504. It was named after country music artist Mickey Gilley. Cryer met Gilley in a bar where Gilley was performing and invited him to become a co-owner of Cryer's new club. Gilley, the cousin of Jerry Lee Lewis, was soon playing six nights a week, helping the new hotspot to attract entertainers like Willie Nelson, Charlie Daniels, Crystal Gayle, Hank Williams, Jr., Jerry Lee Lewis, George Jones, Johnny Lee, Conway Twitty, Keith Whitley, and hundreds more.

Cryer managed the club's operations until he and Gilley had a falling out in 1989. Gilley felt that Cryer was neither properly maintaining the facility nor booking the high-profile musicians the club was famous for, and wanted to disassociate with the club by removing his famous name. Gilley's closed and litigation between the two partners began. Cryer did not want to lose control of Gilley's and attempted to produce documentation showing the partnership was still valid. Gilley won the court case, and Cryer was ordered to pay Gilley $17 million. The dispute permanently closed Gilley's, ending an 18-year run that saw country music become mainstream in large part due to the club's widespread fame. On July 5, 1990, a fire quickly spread throughout the main building, destroying the club. Gilley and several others in Pasadena suspected that Cryer had the club burned in retaliation over the court decision, but Cryer denied the allegation. Cryer filed for bankruptcy after the court battle with Gilley.

Gilley's Success and The Mechanical Bull
Gilley's fame spread in the early 1980s with the help of Cryer's patent-holding, the mechanical bull. It was prominently featured in the 1980 film Urban Cowboy, with actors John Travolta, Debra Winger, and Scott Glenn shown riding the bull in many scenes. The bull became a huge nightly draw as cowboys from the area took turns testing their skill in front of large crowds. Cryer and Gilley expected lawsuits from patrons getting hurt on the bull but no one sought them. Rides were conducted with a sign posted nearby stating "Ride At Your Own Risk."

After the movie's release, the club's popularity skyrocketed. Gilley's launched its own beer brand, radio show, recording studio, and hundreds of merchandise items from drinking glasses and stickers to panties and jeans emblazoned with the Gilley's logo. Gilley's white-and-red bumper stickers were commonly seen on cars throughout the Houston area.  Fans would steal tiles from the acoustical ceiling because they were stamped with the club's logo. With Gilley's indoor rodeo arena as an added attraction, the  club hosted a packed house of thousands every night. The space fielded oversized bars and dance floors to accommodate crowds, and the club was so big that visitors could not see from one end of the building to the other. 

Open seven nights a week from 10am to 2am, Gilley's regularly featured a myriad of activities, contests, and food. The club offered dozens of pool tables, pinball machines, video arcade games, punching bag games, even strong-arm wrestling games. There were mechanical bulls, mechanical horses, and mechanical calves. Cryer supplied the mattresses that surrounded the mechanical bull, often driving around Pasadena collecting discards based on tips on where to find them. Gilley's staged everything from Dolly Parton look-alike contests to tricycle races, with cowboys often falling off of the trikes to the amusement of the crowd. Gilley's is in the Guinness Book of World Records as the World's Largest Night Club.

Urban Cowboy
Journalist Aaron Latham became a frequent visitor of the club, and Cryer asked Latham to write about Gilley's. Latham captured the spirit of Gilley's in a cover story for Esquire titled "The Ballad of the Urban Cowboy: America's Search for "True Grit"" for the September 1978 issue. Music executive Irving Azoff took notice and secured rights to the story for a movie. Latham and director James Bridges co-wrote the screenplay, John Travolta was chosen for the lead role of Bud Davis, and Debra Winger was selected to play Sissy, Bud's romantic interest. The movie was filmed on-location in Pasadena, with all of the club interiors and exteriors filmed at Gilley's, and regular patrons and locals featured as extras. It was box office hit in 1980, earning over $53 million against a $10 million budget. The film's soundtrack showcased a collection of country music's top artists and songs, including the hit "Lookin' For Love" by Johnny Lee.

Personal life
In addition to operating Gilley's, Cryer owned and managed convenience stores, bars, sign shops, and vending machines in the Houston area. He wore overalls, collected old coins, and enjoyed listening to classic country music. Cryer married twice and had children. He was of French and German descent. Cryer died on August 13, 2009 at the age of 81.

References

People from Pasadena, Texas
1927 births
2009 deaths
People from Angelina County, Texas